Bupleurum elatum is a species of flowering plant in the family Apiaceae. It is endemic to Italy. Its natural habitat is Mediterranean-type shrubby vegetation.

References

elatum
Flora of Italy
Critically endangered plants
Taxonomy articles created by Polbot